Several high-altitude airspace security events were reported in February 2023, initially over North America, then over Latin America, China, and Eastern Europe.

North American sightings 

After the sightings of a Chinese balloon in 2023 (later shot down off the coast of South Carolina), the U.S. began more closely scrutinizing its airspace at high altitudes, including by radar enhancements that allowed the U.S. to better categorize and track slower-moving objects. General Glen VanHerck, the commander of NORAD, said that in 2021, up to 98% of raw radar data was not routinely analyzed, because the military aimed to filter out radio signal emanating from flocks of birds or weather balloons (as opposed to potential threats). VanHerck said that the U.S. adjustments to radar monitoring in 2023, after the Chinese spy balloon intrusion, gave the U.S. "better fidelity on seeing smaller objects." The U.S. radar adjustments and increased vigilance increased the detection of objects. It remains unknown when state-actor balloon incursions had begun. 

On February 14, after unidentified high-altitude objects had been detected and shot down over northern Alaska, Yukon, and Lake Huron, White House spokesman John Kirby said that the U.S. Intelligence Community "will not dismiss as a possibility that these could be balloons that were simply tied to commercial or research entities and therefore benign. That very well could be, or could emerge, as a leading explanation here." The downing of the Yukon object, on February 11, 2023, marked the first deployment of NORAD to down an aerial object within the 64-year history of the US-Canadian aerospace warning and air sovereignty organization. The objects shot down over northern Alaska, Yukon, and Lake Huron were all smaller than the Chinese balloon shot down over South Carolina. A report by The Guardian on 17 February suggested that one of the objects "may have been amateur hobbyists’ $12 balloon."

When asked about possible extraterrestrial origin of the three objects downed over North America between February 9–12, General Glen D. VanHerck said he personally had not "ruled out anything", but he deferred to U.S. intelligence experts.

Recovery operations
Since several of the objects were downed in relatively inaccessible locations, ranging from sea ice off the Arctic Ocean coast of Alaska to remote alpine terrain in Yukon and deep US-Canada boundary waters in the middle of Lake Huron, recovery efforts have required considerable amounts of coordination and care.

On February 16, 2023, the Royal Canadian Mounted Police announced that the search for the Lake Huron object had been suspended due to deteriorating weather and low chance of recovery.

On February 18, 2023, it was reported that the searches for the Alaska, Yukon and Lake Huron objects had all been abandoned.

List of events

See also 

 Airspace class
 Unidentified flying object
 Jetpack man

Further reading

References 

2023 controversies in the United States
2023 in military history
2023-related lists
Aviation accidents and incidents in 2023
Aviation security
February 2023 events in the United States
International security
Lists of aviation accidents and incidents
Unidentified flying objects